The Anglican dioceses of Mount Kenya are the Anglican presence in east-central, north and north-east Kenya; they are part of the Anglican Church of Kenya. The remaining dioceses of the Church area in the areas of Mombasa, of Maseno, and of Nakuru.

Diocese of Mount Kenya South

The Diocese of Fort Hall was renamed as Mount Kenya diocese in 1964, a few years after its erection from the Diocese of Mombasa; it was then split in 1975, into East and South; Kariuki, the last Bishop of Mount Kenya, became the first Bishop of Mount Kenya South. The Central diocese was split off in 1984, the West in 1993, and then Thika diocese (from the South and Central dioceses) in 1998. The present cathedral is St James's Cathedral Kiambu.

Bishops of Fort Hall
1961–1964: Obadiah Kariuki

Bishops of Mount Kenya
1964–1975: Obadiah Kariuki
Esbon Ngaruiya, Assistant Bishop

Bishops of Mount Kenya South
1975–1976: Obadiah Kariuki (retired)
1976–1982: Sospeter Magua
1985–1995 : George Njuguna (resigned)
1996–2004: Peter Njenga
2004–2019: Timothy Ranji
2019–present: Charles Muturi (previously Assistant Bishop since 31 October 2010)

Diocese of Embu

The Diocese of Mount Kenya East was erected from Mount Kenya diocese in 1975 and was itself then split on 1 July 1990, when Kirinyaga diocese was formed: Gitari was elected to that See, but the old cathedral of the eastern mountain diocese was in the new Embu diocese. On 1 July 1997, the Diocese was split again to create Mbeere diocese.

Bishops of Mount Kenya East
20 July 19751990: David Gitari (became first Bishop of Kirinyaga)
July 19841989: Bob Beak, Assistant Bishop of Marsabit

Bishops of Embu
1990–2006: Moses Njue
2 July 20062014: Henry Kathii (retired)
7 December 2014present: David Muriithi

Diocese of Mount Kenya Central

Erected in 1984 on the division of Mount Kenya South diocese, the Central diocese was itself split in 1993 (Mount Kenya West) and in 1998 (Thika).

Bishops of Mount Kenya Central
1984–1993: John Mahia-ini
1993–2003: Julius Gatambo
16 June 2002present: Allan Waithaka, Assistant Bishop (also Archbishop's Commissary, i.e. acting bishop diocesan, 2015–2017)
2004–2015: Isaac Ng'ang'a
31 July 2017present: Timothy Gichere

Diocese of Kirinyaga

The Kirinyaga diocese was created in July 1990 from the Diocese of Mount Kenya East; the Diocese of Meru was split from this diocese in 1997.

Bishops of Kirinyaga
1991–1997: David Gitari (previously Bishop of Mount Kenya East; became Archbishop of Kenya and Bishop of Nairobi)
1997–2012: Daniel Ngoru
?–2006 (died): William Waqo, Assistant Bishop and Provincial Secretary
9 December 2012present: Joseph Kibuchua

Diocese of Mount Kenya West

Mount Kenya West was erected in 1993 from  Mount Kenya Central.

Bishops of Mount Kenya West
Between the diocese's erection and Chipman's consecration, the archdeacon, Domenic Mûthoga Ndaî, was Archbishop's Commissary (acting bishop).
4 July 19932004: Alfred Chipman
8 August 2004present: Joseph Kagûnda

Diocese of Mbeere

The Diocese of Mbeere was erected from the Diocese of Embu on 1 July 1997.

Bishops of Mbeere
26 October 1997?: Gideon Ireri
12 October 2008present: Moses Nthuka

Diocese of Meru

1 July 1997 also saw the creation of the Diocese of Meru from the Diocese of Kirinyaga.

Bishops of Meru
1998–2002: Henry Paltridge
22 December 2002present: Charles Mwendwa

Diocese of Thika

Thika diocese was created from portions of two dioceses — Mount Kenya South and Mount Kenya Central — on 1 July 1998.

Bishops of Thika
At the first diocesan synod, 2 July 1998, John Mutonga, the archdeacon, was named the Archbishop's Commissary (i.e. acting bishop) until the first bishop's consecration.
31 January 1999?: Gideon Githiga
2013–present: Julius Wanyoike

Diocese of Marsabit

Marsabit, then in the Diocese of Kirinyaga, was erected into a Mission Area directly under the Archbishop in 2008 — it was therefore part of the All Saints' Cathedral Diocese — and eventually given autonomy as its own diocese in 2011.

Bishops of Marsabit
Rob Martin was the bishop for the Mission Area from 2008, as a suffragan bishop of the Archbishop and therefore of the All Saints' Cathedral Diocese.
2011–2016: Rob Martin
2016–present: Daniel Qampicha Wario (consecrated 1 May 2016)

Diocese of Murang'a South

Similarly, Murang'a South was another Mission Area of All Saints' from 2008, but originally part of Kirinyaga diocese. It has been a diocese in its own right since 2013.

Bishops of Murang'a South
25 May 2014present: Julius Karanu Gicheru

References

 
 
 
 
Anglicanism in Kenya
Religion in the British Empire
History of Kenya
Anglican dioceses established in the 20th century
Anglican dioceses established in the 21st century

1961 establishments in Kenya
1975 establishments in Kenya
1984 establishments in Kenya
1990 establishments in Kenya
1993 establishments in Kenya
1997 establishments in Kenya
1998 establishments in Kenya
2011 establishments in Kenya
2013 establishments in Kenya